Lebanon competed at the 2020 Summer Olympics in Tokyo. Originally scheduled to take place from 24 July to 9 August 2020, the Games were postponed to 23 July to 8 August 2021, because of the COVID-19 pandemic.

It was the nation's eighteenth appearance at the Summer Olympics. Lebanon did not attend the 1956 Summer Olympics in Melbourne as a response to the Suez Crisis. During the opening ceremony countries marched in the order of traditional Japanese characters using Gojūon script and Russia removed from the standard list due to doping sanctions, Lebanon was placed last in the parade of nations before 2028 host nation United States and 2024 host nation France, and as well as the host nation Japan.

Competitors
The following is the list of number of competitors in the Games.

Athletics

Lebanon received a universality slot from the World Athletics to send a male track and field athlete to the Olympics.

Track & road events

Judo
 
Lebanon entered one male judoka  into the Olympic tournament based on the International Judo Federation Olympics Individual Ranking.

Shooting

Lebanese shooters achieved a quota place for the following event by virtue of her best finish at the 2018 ISSF World Championships, the 2019 ISSF World Cup series, and Asian Championships, as long as they obtained a minimum qualifying score (MQS) by May 31, 2020.

Swimming 

Lebanon received a universality invitation from FINA to send two top-ranked swimmers (one per gender) in their respective individual events to the Olympics, based on the FINA Points System of June 28, 2021.

Weightlifting

Lebanon entered one female weightlifter into the Olympic competition, signifying the nation's return to the sport for the first time since Sydney 2000. Mahassen Fattouh topped the list of weightlifters from Asia in the women's 76 kg category based on the IWF Absolute Continental Rankings.

References

Nations at the 2020 Summer Olympics
2020
2021 in Lebanese sport